The Ecuador national baseball team is the national baseball team of Ecuador. The team represents Ecuador in international competitions.

Honors
Baseball at the Summer Olympics
2008 : Lost in qualifying.

References

National baseball teams
Baseball in South America
Baseball